The DeBeque Formation is a geologic formation in Colorado's Piceance Basin, preserving fossils which date back to the Late Paleocene to Early Eocene period (Clarkforkian to Wasatchian in the NALMA classification. Examples of these fossils are held in the University of Colorado Museum of Natural History.

Wasatchian correlations

See also 
 List of fossiliferous stratigraphic units in Colorado
 Paleontology in Colorado

References

Bibliography

Further reading 

 A. J. Lichtig and S. G. Lucas. 2015. Paleocene-Eocene turtles of the Piceance Creek Basin, Colorado. New Mexico Museum of Natural History and Science Bulletin 67:145-152
 A. J. Kihm. 1984. Early Eocene Mammalian Fauna of the Piceance Creek Basin. Northwestern Colorado
 K. P. Schmidt. 1938. New crocodilians from the upper Paleocene of western Colorado. Geological Series of Field Museum of Natural History 6(21):315-321

Geologic formations of Colorado
Eocene Series of North America
Paleocene Series of North America
Paleogene Colorado
Thanetian Stage
Ypresian Stage
Clarkforkian
Wasatchian
Sandstone formations
Fluvial deposits
Ooliferous formations
Fossiliferous stratigraphic units of North America
Paleontology in Colorado